The 2020 Hartford Athletic season was the club's second season of existence and their second in the USL Championship, the second tier of American soccer. This article covers the period from October 20, 2019, the day after Hartford's final match of the 2019 regular season, to the conclusion of the 2020 USL-C Playoff Final, scheduled for November 12–16, 2020.

Season in review

Background, off-season and pre-season
Hartford finished its inaugural season in next to last place in the Eastern Conference, seven table positions and fourteen points out of the playoff spots. The club parted ways with head coach Jimmy Nielsen just seven days after the 2019 season's end and signed former Southampton U-23 coach Radhi Jaïdi to fill the vacancy on November 8. The club also parted ways with COO Donovan Powell five days later.

The club began announcing roster moves in October, also, quickly announcing the return of four players from the 2019 roster (Harry Swartz, Alex Dixon, Alex Davey, and Nicky Downs), with the return of Danny Barrera and Mads Jørgensen being announced in early November, and the return of Mike Novotny being announced in early December. New signings began in earnest in late November with the addition of Aiden Mesias, former Fresno FC defender Sam Strong, Brazilian defender Gabriel Torres, 2019 Greenville Triumph center back Kevin Politz, Cal State Northridge products Dre Deas and Alex Lara, Dartmouth midfielder Noah Paravicini, and UT-Rio Grande Valley midfielder Arthur Rogers. In January, the club signed San Antonio FC's all-time leading scorer Éver Guzmán, Brazilian defender Matheus Silva, and announced the return of forward Mac Steeves. In February, the club announced loan deals for goalkeeper Parfait Mandanda and Southampton U-23 midfielder Tyreke Johnson.

Roster

Competitions

Exhibitions

Match results

USL Championship

Standings — Group F

Match results
In the preparations for the resumption of league play following the shutdown prompted by the COVID-19 pandemic, Hartford's schedule was announced on July 2.

USL Cup Playoffs

U.S. Open Cup 

As a USL Championship club, Hartford as enter the competition in the Second Round, to be played April 7–9. The 2020 U.S. Open Cup was cancelled due to the COVID-19 pandemic.

Statistics

Appearances and goals

 ||16 || 6 ||15 || 6
 || 13 || 5 || 12|| 5
 ||15  || 1||14 ||1
 ||7  || 1||7 ||1
 || 14 || 0||13 ||0
 || 7 || 0|| 7||0
 ||10  ||1 ||9 ||1
 || 8 || 0|| 7||0
 ||14  || 2|| 13||2
 ||11  || 0|| 11||0
 || 9 ||1 || 8||1
 ||  4||1 || 4||1
 ||15  || 2|| 14||2
 || 17 ||2 || 16||2
 ||0  || 0|| 0||0
 ||12  ||2 || 12||2
 ||15  ||1 ||14 ||1
 || 15 || 1|| 14||1
 ||12  ||1 || 12||1
 ||0  ||0 || 0||0
 || 8 ||1 ||7 ||1
|-
|colspan=10 align=center|Players who left Hartford during the season:
 ||14  ||2 ||14 ||2
 || 3 || 0|| 3|| 0

|}

Disciplinary record

Clean sheets

Transfers

In

Out

Loan in

Loan out

Kits

See also
 Hartford Athletic
 2020 in American soccer
 2020 USL Championship season

References

Hartford Athletic
Hartford Athletic
Hartford Athletic
Hartford Athletic